Edmond Fayçal Tapsoba (born 2 February 1999) is a Burkinabé professional footballer who plays as a centre-back for Bundesliga club Bayer Leverkusen and the Burkina Faso national team.

Early and personal life 
Tapsoba grew up in the Karpala section of Ouagadougou where he played football in the streets, but he never played organized football until the age of fourteen. As a child, he would often skip school to play football. He is represented by former Portugal international Deco. Tapsoba can speak some English, as well as French. During the COVID-19 pandemic, Tapsoba donated masks, gloves, and hand sanitiser to a market in Ouagadougou.

Club career
Tapsoba played for Salitas, US Ouagadougou, Leixões, Vitória de Guimarães B, and Vitória de Guimarães.

On 31 January 2020, Tapsoba agreed to a five-and-a-half-year contract with Bayer Leverkusen for a fee of €18 million plus €7 million for objectives. On 21 February 2021, he scored his first Bundesliga goal for Bayer Leverkusen in the final seconds of stoppage time in a match against FC Augsburg, equalising for his side and extending Leverkusen's unbeaten streak against Augsburg to twenty matches.

International career
Tapsoba made his international debut for Burkina Faso in 2016.

Style of playing
Tapsoba has been compared to Jérôme Boateng for his speed, strength, passing ability, and composure. He is also known for his ability to score goals, especially from the penalty spot. He cites players such as John Stones, Per Mertesacker, and Virgil van Dijk as inspirations.

Honours
Individual
Africa Cup of Nations Team of the Tournament: 2021

References

Living people
1999 births
Association football defenders
Outfield association footballers who played in goal
Burkinabé footballers
Burkina Faso international footballers
Salitas FC players
US Ouagadougou players
Leixões S.C. players
Vitória S.C. players
Bayer 04 Leverkusen players
Primeira Liga players
Liga Portugal 2 players
Bundesliga players
Burkinabé expatriate footballers
Burkinabé expatriate sportspeople in Portugal
Expatriate footballers in Portugal
Burkinabé expatriate sportspeople in Germany
Expatriate footballers in Germany
21st-century Burkinabé people
2021 Africa Cup of Nations players